Michael T. Aiken (born August 20, 1932) is a sociologist and professor who served as the 6th chancellor at the University of Illinois at Urbana-Champaign and provost at the University of Pennsylvania.

Education 
Aiken received his bachelor's from the University of Mississippi in 1954 and his master's degree from the University of Michigan in 1955, and respectively his Ph.D. in 1964.

Career 
Aiken's career spans across multiple universities. After earning his Ph.D., Aiken was a professor at the University of Wisconsin from 1963 to 1984.  He was promoted to full professorship in 1970. He served as Chair of the Department of Sociology at the University of Wisconsin from 1976 to 1979 and Associate Dean, College of Letters and Science from 1980 to 1982.  While at Wisconsin, Aiken held visiting professor positions at 1967–68 Columbia University, 1982–83 Washington University in St. Louis, and three visiting professorships in Belgium:  1969–71, Katholieke Universiteit de Leuven; 1973 Universite Catholique de Louvain; and Fall 1982–83 Universite Catholique de Louvaina in Belgium.

In 1984–85, Aiken was a chair of the sociology department at the University of Pennsylvania. A year later, he was named the dean of the School of Arts and Sciences where he served from 1985 to 1987. From 1987 to 1993 he served as provost of the University of Pennsylvania

1n 1993 Aiken was appointed as the sixth chancellor of the University of Illinois at Urbana-Champaign and served until June 2001. Under his leadership, the Grainger Engineering Library was dedicated, and the university made efforts to create a research park. In addition, Aiken recommended that Chief Illiniwek be removed as a mascot from the university.

References 

1932 births
American sociologists
Leaders of the University of Illinois
Living people
Sociology educators
University of Michigan College of Literature, Science, and the Arts alumni
University of Mississippi alumni
Columbia University faculty
Washington University in St. Louis faculty
University of Pennsylvania faculty